Souvik Mahapatra is a professor of electrical engineering at Indian Institute of Technology Bombay (IIT Bombay) and Fellow of the Institute of Electrical and Electronics Engineers (IEEE) for contributions to "CMOS transistor gate stack reliability".

References 

Fellow Members of the IEEE
Living people
IIT Bombay alumni
Year of birth missing (living people)